Alfred Russell Cobb (June 7, 1892 – September 12, 1974) was an American college and professional football player.  Cobb played college football for Syracuse University, and later played professionally in the National Football League (NFL).

Cobb attended Syracuse University, where he played for the Syracuse Orange football team.  In 1917 he was recognized as a consensus first-team All-American at the tackle position, having received first-team honors from International News Service (INS), News Enterprise Association (NEA), and Collier's Weekly (as selected by Walter Camp).

Cobb played in the early days of the NFL, when it was still known as the American Professional Football Association (APFA), including for the Akron Pros and the Cleveland Bulldogs.  As a member of the 1920 Akron Pros, Cobb was a member of the very first NFL Championship team.

Over three APFA/NFL seasons, Cobb played in 21 games as a lineman, starting 16 of them.

References

1892 births
1974 deaths
American football tackles
Akron Pros players
Cleveland Bulldogs players
Syracuse Orange football players
All-American college football players
People from Athol, Massachusetts
Sportspeople from Waltham, Massachusetts
Players of American football from Massachusetts
Sportspeople from Worcester County, Massachusetts